Mount Tauhara is a dormant lava dome volcano in New Zealand's North Island, reaching  above sea level. It is situated in the area of caldera rim overlap of the Whakamaru Caldera and Taupō Volcano towards the centre of the Taupō Volcanic Zone, which stretches from Whakaari / White Island in the north to Mount Ruapehu in the south.

Formed about 65,000 years ago, Mount Tauhara was not a violently explosive vent, instead slowly oozing a viscous dacitic lava. It is the largest mass of dacite within the Taupō volcano, whose material is 98% rhyolitic. Little evidence of its volcanic past remains today; the peak is covered in dense native bush.

There is a steep walking track to the top of Mount Tauhara, starting at Mountain Road. On a clear day, the summit offers excellent views over the Volcanic Plateau, encompassing the entirety of Lake Taupō in the southwest.  The hike is relatively strenuous and takes about an hour and a half each way. The track is not well groomed; being slightly overgrown in some places. However, there is a pristine spring near the top perfect for drinking and the view at the summit is spectacular.

This is the Māori legend about Mt Tauhara:

The warrior mountains of Taranaki,  Pūtauaki, Tongariro and Tauhara  were  deeply in love with Pīhanga the mountain that  stands above Tūrangi at the southern end of Lake Taupō.  A  battle erupted to win Pīhanga's favour and the victor  was Tongariro.  At their defeat, the other mountains decided to leave Tongariro's domain, travelling as far away as they could in the course of one night. Taranaki fled west towards the setting sun, and Pūtauaki and Tauhara fled north towards the sunrise.  Pūtauaki moved fast and is now located near Whakatane and is also known as Mt Edgecumbe.  But Tauhara was sad and with a heavy heart he  traveled reluctantly.  When overtaken by dawn he had only reached the north eastern shore of Lake Taupō.  Here he stands to this day looking mournfully across the lake towards his lost love, Pīhanga.

Tauhara is the point to which Ngātoroirangi, the high priest of Te Arawa canoe, and ariki-ancestor of Tūwharetoa, climbed when he first came to the region seeking lands for his followers.

"Tauhara" is Māori for "alone, or isolated".

See also
List of volcanoes in New Zealand
Tauhara
Ngāti Tūwharetoa

References

External links
Te Ara Encyclopaedia of New Zealand website
Institute of Geological and Nuclear Sciences website

Tauhara, Mount
Taupō District
Tauhara
Landforms of Waikato
Tauhara, Mount